The 2021–22 PFC Sochi season was Sochi's third season in the Russian Premier League, the highest tier of association football in Russia, and their forth season as a club. Sochi finished the season in 2nd position, where knocked out of the Russian Cup at the Round of 16 stage by CSKA Moscow, and the Third qualifying round of the UEFA Europa Conference League by Partizan.

Squad

Transfers

In

Loans in

Out

Loans out

Pre-season and friendlies

Competitions

Overview

Premier League

League table

Results summary

Results by round

Results

Russian Cup

UEFA Europa Conference League

Qualifying rounds

Second qualifying round
The draw for the second qualifying round was held on 16 June 2021.

Third qualifying round
The draw for the third qualifying round was held on 19 July 2021.

Squad statistics

Appearances and goals

|-
|colspan="14"|Players away from the club on loan:

|-
|colspan="14"|Players who appeared for Sochi but left during the season:

|}

Goal scorers

Clean sheets

Disciplinary record

References

PFC Sochi seasons
PFC Sochi
2021–22 UEFA Europa Conference League participants seasons